The Green Star Series is a set of five science fantasy novels written by American writer Lin Carter, published by DAW Books,  from 1972 to 1976.  In these novels, the concept of soul-projection (introduced by Edgar Rice Burroughs in his John Carter series) is central.  The series is written from the viewpoint of an anonymous, rich, crippled 30-year-old who seeks adventure—and finds it on a planet revolving around a green star.

Volumes
 Under the Green Star (1972)
 When the Green Star Calls (1973)
 By the Light of the Green Star (1974)
 As the Green Star Rises (1975)
 In the Green Star's Glow (1976)

Storyline
An anonymous, rich, crippled American gets books from the Tibetan monastery at Qanguptoy, from which he learns the art of soul projection.  Longing for an adventure, and restricted by his earthly body, he looks at the sky one night and sees a green star (referred to later as The Green Star) and projects his soul to a cloud-covered planet revolving around it.  The texts of the five volumes of the series are ostensibly transcripts of first-person narratives by the anonymous author recounting his adventures: the first after he took the (preserved) body of Chong The Mighty, and returned to earth after Chong was killed by a brigand; the rest, in his second incarnation as Karn The Hunter (where the author had taken over Karn's just-dead body).  Through a bequest, these come into the hands of Lin Carter, who "edits" them for publication.

Setting
The surface of the planet revolving about The Green Star is largely covered by a tropical forest of multi-mile-high trees in whose tops are the main cities including Phaolon, Ardha and Kamadhong.  The human inhabitants of these arboreal cities, known as Laonese, use large moths (dhua) to draw carriages, and dragonflies (zaiphs) for individual transport.  Other (than Laonese) races of humans include:
  the savage albino troglodyte dwellers among the huge trees' roots (near the forest's ground level)
  the Blue Barbarians, a nomadic race who at unpredictable intervals are afflicted by an insanity (the entire race is affected) causing them to destroy and pillage whatever cities are in their vicinity
  the Komarians and Tharkoonians, basically similar to the Laonese, but dwelling on islands in an inland sea (for which the Laonese use the word zand, though they generally think it legendary) known as the Sea Of Komar
  the black humans of Calidar, who think of themselves as the only humans and of the Laonese as mere beasts with human shape; Calidar has many captive Laonese (and their descendants) whom the ebon men use for experiments
  the Kaloodha, an ancient race of winged humanoids who are almost extinct (the one survivor is over a million years old) due to foolish experiments to make them immortal

The planet is closer to The Green Star than the earth is to the sun; it is protected from being seared by a thick, almost unbroken cloud-cover.  However, the cloud-cover does not protect the planet from tidal effects (observable in the Sea of Komar).

In all of the novels, it is assumed (by the author) that humans retain terrestrial size; he confesses at two points in the series that he does not know if this is the case, or if humans are miniaturised with other creatures retaining terrestrial size (in one of the two places, he believes this may make more sense).

External links

Book series introduced in 1972
Fiction about planets
Science fiction book series
Science fantasy novels
Fantasy novel series
Novels by Lin Carter
Planetary romances
DAW Books books